Sarunrat Visutthithada (ศรัณย์รัชต์ วิสุทธิธาดา), also known as Lydia Sarunrat, is a Thai singer. She  debuted in 2005 with her album Lydia. Her music became a hit across Thailand. Her single "Wang Leaw Chuay Toh Klub reached number one for consecutive weeks after its release. Deemed the "Princess of R&B" music in Thailand, Lydia was nominated for 'Most Popular Artist' at the MTV's Asia Award.

Aside from her music career, Lydia acted in Thailand's popular Channel 3 series, having first starred in Rabum Duang Dao in 2010.

As the face of Reebok, Lydia is a health and fitness influencer.

Early life 
Lydia was born on July 7, 1987 in Bangkok, Thailand. Lydia began intensive vocal training at age 10 in pursuit of her music career. She attended the International School of Bangkok where she sang in an a cappella group called 'UNDEFINED' and won the ISB Idol Competition. Lydia accepted a spot in Northwestern University's Class of 2009 but later diverted from academics to focus on her music career.

Career 
Lydia debuted her eponymous album in the summer of 2005. She became an R&B sensation across Thailand that earned her the title the "Princess of R&B". Her music consistently landed on the top of the charts. Her first hit single was number one for nine consecutive weeks.

In addition to her music career, Lydia began acting. Her first TV series was Rabum Duang Dao. She starred in Sanaeha Sunya Kaen (2014) and Peun Ruk Peun Rissaya (2015).

Lydia also works as a model. She has graced the covers of Numéro, Women's Health, Shape, Volume, and many more. As an ambassador for Reebok, Lydia advocates for healthy living and following a fitness regime. She uses her platform and influence in order to promote and inspire body positivity, healthiness, and activeness. Her book, Lydia's Diary, provides health and diet tips.

TV Dramas 
 Rabum Duang Dao
 Sanaeha Sunya Kaen
 Peun Ruk Peun Rissaya

Master of Ceremony: MC ON TV

Advertising

Music video appearance
 2004 Yuen Pid Tee (ยืนผิดที่) - Aline bass (RS/YouTube:rsfriends) with ภาณุพงศ์ วราเอกศิริ (ซาหริ่ม)

Awards 
 Season Awards - won Best Female Artist (2005)
 Seed Awards - won Best Female Artist (2005)
 Seventeen Music Choice Awards - won Best Female Artist (2006 - 2007)
 Zen Awards - won Most Stylish Woman and Popular (2008)

References 

1987 births
Living people
Lydia Sarunrat Deane
Lydia Sarunrat Deane
Lydia Sarunrat Deane
Thai television personalities
Lydia Sarunrat Deane
Lydia Sarunrat Deane